Iván Hernández Soto (born 27 February 1980) is a retired Spanish footballer who played as a central defender.

He spent the better part of his career with Sporting de Gijón after signing in 2007, going on appear in 165 competitive games and play in four La Liga seasons.

Club career
Hernández was born in Madrid. After having started professionally with modest teams in the area, he moved in 2003 to Málaga CF's reserves, where he helped the Andalusians retain their Segunda División status during two seasons.

Hernández played from 2005 to 2007 with Real Valladolid, appearing in 26 games in his second year and achieving his first La Liga promotion. However, he stayed in that tier, joining Sporting de Gijón and being instrumental in the Asturias club's 2008 promotion, while often shifting from defender to defensive midfielder.

Hernández made his top flight debut on 31 August 2008 at the age of 28, in a 1–2 home loss against Getafe CF. He finished the campaign being one of the team's most used stoppers, as they barely escaped relegation.

Since 2011, Hernández acted as Sporting's main captain.

References

External links

1980 births
Living people
Footballers from Madrid
Spanish footballers
Association football defenders
Association football utility players
La Liga players
Segunda División players
Segunda División B players
Tercera División players
Atlético Madrid C players
CF Rayo Majadahonda players
Atlético Madrid B players
AD Alcorcón footballers
Atlético Malagueño players
Real Valladolid players
Sporting de Gijón players